Darya Khan, is an administrative subdivision (tehsil), of Bhakkar District in the Punjab province of Pakistan. The town of Darya Khan is the headquarters of the tehsil.

According to the 2017 Census of Pakistan, it has a population of 360,427.

References 

Tehsils of Punjab, Pakistan
Bhakkar District